William Bradford Willcox (October 29, 1907 – September 15, 1985) was an American historian.

He was born in Ithaca, New York.  He died in North Haven, Connecticut.

Education: He received his B.A. from Cornell University in 1928 and studied at Cambridge University.  At Yale University he studied architecture (B.F.A., 1932), and Tudor-Stuart English history (Ph.D.,1936).  Wallace Notestein directed his dissertation, which was recognized as a pioneer study of government in Gloucestershire.  The work received the distinguished John Addison Porter Prize for best work of scholarship in a given year.

Academic, research, and administrative appointments:  Assistant in Research (history), Yale University, 1934-1935.  Instructor in history, Williams College, 1936-1941.  Professor of history, University of Michigan, 1941-1970.  Chair of the Department.  A Member of the Institute for Advanced Studies, 1946.  Fulbright lecturer at Oxford University, 1957-1958.  Professor of History, Yale University, January 1970-June 1976. Visiting Lecturer, Yale College (Residential Colleges), 1978 2nd term-1979.  Yale residential college fellow, Calhoun College, 1970-1979. Editor, Papers of Benjamin Franklin, January 1970 – 1985.

Awards
 1936 John Addison Porter Prize, Yale University
 c.1938.  1900 Fund at Williams College for research on Gloucestershire.
 1945.  Henry Russel Award, University of Michigan, for his book, Star of Empire.
 1965 Bancroft Prize for his Portrait of a General (the prize has been generally considered to be among the most prestigious awards in the field of American history writing).

Works
 Willcox, William B. Gloucestershire, a study in local government, 1590-1640. Yale University Press, 1940.
 Willcox, William B. Star of Empire - A Study of Britain as a World Power 1485-1945. Knopf, 1950.
 Clinton, Sir Henry. Sir Henry Clinton, The American rebellion: Sir Henry Clinton's narrative of his campaigns, 1775-1782, with an appendix of original documents.  William B. Willcox, ed.  Yale University Press, 1954.
 Willcox, William B. Portrait of a General.  Sir Henry Clinton in the War for Independence. Knopf, 1964.
 William B. Willcox. The Age of Aristocracy 1688 to 1830.  Houghton Mifflin, 1966.
 Franklin, Benjamin. The papers of Benjamin Franklin.  Edited by William B. Willcox and others, Volumes 15-26.  Yale University Press, 1972-1987.

References

Historians of the American Revolution
University of Michigan faculty
1907 births
1985 deaths
Cornell University alumni
Yale University alumni
Writers from Ithaca, New York
20th-century American historians
American male non-fiction writers
Historians from New York (state)
Bancroft Prize winners
20th-century American male writers
Fulbright alumni